Dana M. King  (1890 – April 19, 1952) was an American football and baseball coach.  He served as the head football coach at the University of Cincinnati from 1931 to 1934, compiling a record of 25–10–1.

Early life and education
King graduated from Ohio University in 1917. He played football for the Bobcats as an end.

Coaching career

Hamilton High School
King served as football coach at Hamilton High School. He coached 16 seasons (1917, 1919–1929 and 1943–1945), going 104–26–8, with his only losing season being in 1917 (3–5–1). From 1926 to 1929, his team went 35–2–1 with a 10–0 season in 1929 in which they scored 332 points while allowing only 19. From 1928 to 1930, his team had an 18-game winning streak. His teams used single-wing and double-wing offenses for most of his career before going to a T-formation attack in his term in the 1940s. He also served time as coach for baseball, track, and basketball. For basketball, he coached from 1917 to 1929, with an 18–0 team in 1926–27 before losing in the District Tournament finals. He went 148–59 as coach. In the 1920s, he served as city recreation director, along with overseeing development of the playground system in the city. He also helped establish softball leagues and coached a local American Legion football team.

University of Cincinnati
King joined the University of Cincinnati as an assistant football coach in 1930. He became coach the next year, along with athletic director in 1932. In his four seasons as coach, he went 25–10–1, with two conference titles. He stepped down as coach in 1934, although he stayed on as athletic director until 1936.

Cincinnati Bengals
In 1939, King became coach of the original Cincinnati Bengals. They went 6–2 in 1939, good for second in the American Professional Football Association. They joined the American Football League in 1940. They went 1–7 in 1940 and 1–5–2 in 1941 before disbanding after World War II shuttled the league and the team.

Return to Hamilton High School
King returned to Hamilton High School in 1942 to serve as head football coach and athletic director. He left coaching after 1945 due to ill health.

Later life and death
After the 1946–47 school year, he retired as a math teacher. He was inducted into the Butler County Sports and Hamilton School Athletic Halls of Fame. 
King died on April 19, 1952, at his home in Glenford, Ohio.

Head coaching record

College football

References

External links
 

1890 births
1952 deaths
American football ends
Cincinnati Bearcats athletic directors
Cincinnati Bearcats baseball coaches
Cincinnati Bearcats football coaches
Ohio Bobcats baseball players
Ohio Bobcats football players
High school baseball coaches in the United States
High school basketball coaches in Ohio
High school football coaches in Ohio
People from Perry County, Ohio
Players of American football from Ohio
Baseball players from Ohio